John Cotman may refer to:
 John Sell Cotman (1782–1842), English marine and landscape painter
 John Joseph Cotman (1814–1878), his son, English landscape painter